Robert Stallman (1946–2019) was an American classical flutist, arranger, and music educator. He premiered several works by contemporary composers including Karel Husa, William Thomas McKinley, and Burr Van Nostrand and was the first to record works by several others including John Harbison's Die Kuerze. In the 1990s he recorded six albums of flute sonatas and concertos for the VAI label.

References

External links

Richard Stallman on AllMusic

1946 births
American classical flautists
New England Conservatory alumni
American music educators
Living people